The 2009–10 Ohio Bobcats men's basketball team represented Ohio University in the college basketball season of 2009–10. The team was coached by John Groce and played their homes game at the Convocation Center.

At the end of the regular season Ohio was seeded 9th in the 2010 MAC men's basketball tournament with a conference record of 7–9. However, the Bobcats reeled off four straight wins to win the MAC tournament, including an overtime win over Akron in the championship game. The victory earned them an automatic bid to the 2010 NCAA Division I men's basketball tournament. On Selection Sunday they were given the 14 seed in the Midwest region and slated to play the 3 seed Georgetown.

In a huge upset, the Bobcats dominated the Hoyas almost the whole game in the first round of the NCAA tournament, beating them 97–83. The win was Ohio's first NCAA Tournament win since 1983, when they toppled Illinois State in the first round. The Bobcats advanced to face the #6 seed Tennessee. They were knocked off by Tennessee 83–67 to finish the season 22–15.

Before the season

Roster changes
The Ohio Bobcats lost six players from last year's team.  Out of those six players, three were starters and two players recorded over 10 points per game.  Jerome Tillman, who averaged 17.7 points and 8.1 rebounds per game for the Bobcats, now plays for the French team ÉS Chalon-sur-Saône  The other two starters that departed from last year's team were Justin Orr and Michael Allen.  Ohio has recruited six players to replace those players for the current season.

Recruiting

Following Ohio's exhibition win against Ashland on November 13, John Groce announced that Marquis Horne had left the team for, "personal reasons."  Horne accrued 15 points and 10 rebounds in his two exhibition games as a Bobcat.

James (Jay) Kinney was dismissed from the team on February 12, 2010 due to repeated violation of team rules and policies.

Roster

Coaching staff

Preseason

Preseason men's basketball poll
On October 28, the members of the MAC News Media Panel voted in the Preseason Media Poll. Ohio was picked last in the MAC East

MAC tournament winner
Akron (19), Buffalo (2), Northern Illinois (1), Kent State (1), Bowling Green (1)

Schedule 

|-
!colspan=9 style=| Exhibition

|-
!colspan=9 style=| Regular Season

|-
!colspan=9 style=|MAC tournament

|-
!colspan=9 style=|  NCAA tournament

Statistics

Team Statistics
Final 2009–10 Statistics

Source

Player statistics

Source

Awards and honors

All-MAC Awards 

Source

References

Ohio Bobcats men's basketball seasons
Ohio Bobcats
Ohio
Bob
Bob